Nicholas Gunnar Goody (born July 6, 1991) is an American professional baseball pitcher for the Long Island Ducks of the Atlantic League of Professional Baseball. He has played in Major League Baseball (MLB) for the New York Yankees, Cleveland Indians, and Texas Rangers.

Amateur career
Goody attended University High School in Orlando, Florida. He played for the school's baseball team as a shortstop. He enrolled at State College of Florida, Manatee–Sarasota to play college baseball, and the team's head coach suggested he become a pitcher. As a freshman, he served as the team's closer. That summer, Goody pitched for the Winter Park Diamond Dawgs of the Florida Collegiate Summer League, and was named most valuable player of the league's championship game. As a sophomore, Goody played as a starting pitcher, and had a 6–2 win–loss record, 1.29 earned run average (ERA), and struck out 114 batters in 84 innings pitched, including 19 strikeouts in one game. He was named the Suncoast Conference Pitcher of the Year as a sophomore.

The New York Yankees selected Goody in the 22nd round of the 2011 Major League Baseball (MLB) draft, but Goody opted not to sign. He played collegiate summer baseball in the Northwoods League for the Mankato Moondogs to focus on the mentality of closing. In 2012, Goody transferred to Louisiana State University (LSU) in order to play for the LSU Tigers baseball team. Nick Rumbelow began the season as LSU's closer, but Goody assumed the role during the season, finishing with 11 saves, third most in the Southeastern Conference.

Professional career

New York Yankees
The Yankees selected Goody with their sixth round pick, the 217th overall selection, of the 2012 MLB draft. Pitching for the Staten Island Yankees of the Class A-Short Season New York–Penn League, the Charleston RiverDogs of the Class A South Atlantic League, and the Tampa Yankees of the Class A-Advanced Florida State League, Goody had a 1.12 ERA and seven saves.

In 2013, the Yankees invited Goody to spring training. He began the season with Tampa, but underwent Tommy John surgery to repair the ulnar collateral ligament of the elbow in his pitching arm, which he injured in his second appearance of the season. He returned to Tampa on May 6, 2014, and was promoted to the Trenton Thunder of the Class AA Eastern League in June. The Yankees invited Goody to spring training in 2015, but reassigned him to minor league camp in mid-March. Goody began the 2015 season with Trenton, and was named to the Eastern League All-Star Game. He was promoted to the Scranton/Wilkes-Barre RailRiders of the Class AAA International League in July, and Brady Lail replaced him in the All-Star Game.

On July 25, the Yankees promoted Goody to the major leagues. The Yankees optioned Goody back to Scranton/Wilkes-Barre on July 28, without having made any major league appearances. The Yankees recalled him on July 30 due to an injury to Michael Pineda. He made his major league debut that day.

On December 15, 2016, Goody was designated for assignment by the Yankees.

Cleveland Indians
The Yankees subsequently traded Goody to the Cleveland Indians on December 20, 2016, in exchange for either a player to be named later or cash considerations.

In 2017, Goody had his best year yet as a reliable reliever, making 56 appearances, logging a 2.80 ERA, and striking out 72 batters in 54 2/3 innings. On October 3, it was announced that he would not be included on the Indians' 25-man roster for the ALDS. In 2018, Goody appeared in 12 games for Cleveland, posting a 6.94 ERA before missing the remainder of the season with a right elbow strain.

In 2019, Goody appeared in 39 games, striking out 50 in  innings. Goody was designated for assignment by the Indians on November 20, 2019.

Texas Rangers
On November 26, 2019, Goody was claimed off of release waivers by the Texas Rangers. As Goody had more than three years of service time, he had the option to accept the assignment or refuse and become a free agent. On December 2, Goody accepted the Rangers claim and was added to their roster. In 2020, Goody recorded a 9.00 ERA, issuing eight walks and allowing 11 runs in as many innings. On September 24, 2020, Goody was designated for assignment, and he elected free agency on September 29.

New York Yankees (second stint)
On February 13, 2021, Goody signed a minor league contract with the New York Yankees for the 2021 season, receiving a non-roster invitation to spring training. After posting a 2.86 ERA in 17 games with the Triple-A Scranton/Wilkes-Barre Railriders, Goody was released by the Yankees on July 4.

Washington Nationals
On July 6, 2021, Goody signed a minor league contract with the Washington Nationals organization and was assigned to the Triple-A Rochester Red Wings. On August 15, Goody was released by the Nationals.

New York Yankees (third stint)
On August 17, 2021, Goody once again signed a minor league contract with the New York Yankees. He was assigned to Triple-A Scranton. Goody elected free agency on November 7, 2021.

Acereros de Monclova
On April 20, 2022, Goody signed with the Acereros de Monclova of the Mexican League. He was released on June 5, 2022.

Long Island Ducks
On June 6, 2022, Goody signed with the Long Island Ducks of the Atlantic League of Professional Baseball.

References

External links

1991 births
Living people
Baseball players from Orlando, Florida
Major League Baseball pitchers
New York Yankees players
Cleveland Indians players
Texas Rangers players
SCF Manatees baseball players
LSU Tigers baseball players
Staten Island Yankees players
Charleston RiverDogs players
Tampa Yankees players
Trenton Thunder players
Scranton/Wilkes-Barre Yankees players
Columbus Clippers players
Scranton/Wilkes-Barre RailRiders players
Rochester Red Wings players
Acereros de Monclova players
American expatriate baseball players in Mexico
Long Island Ducks players
University High School (Orlando, Florida) alumni
State College of Florida, Manatee–Sarasota alumni
Mankato MoonDogs players